The word "turnip" can refer to any of the following four vegetables:
 Turnip (white turnip, summer turnip, Brassica rapa rapa)
 Rutabaga (yellow turnip, Brassica napus or B. napobrassica)
 Jícama (Mexican turnip, yam bean, sweet turnip, Pachyrhizus erosus)
 Daikon (white radish, mooli, Raphanus sativus var. longipinnatus)

Regional differences in terminology

Regional differences in terminology are summarised in the table below.

Brassica napus and B. napobrassica are mostly called swedes (a shortening of Swedish turnip) in England, especially in the South, and in most dialects of the Commonwealth. Rutabaga, from the Swedish rotabagga, for "root bag" is mostly used in North America, in the United States and some parts of Canada. The rutabaga or swede differs from the turnip (Brassica rapa) in that it is typically larger and yellow-orange rather than white. In the Canadian provinces of Ontario, Newfoundland and Labrador and Atlantic Canada, the yellow-fleshed variety are referred to as "turnips", whilst the white-fleshed variety are called "white turnips".

However, in some dialects of British English the two vegetables have overlapping or reversed names: in the north of England and Scotland, the larger, yellow variety may be called "yellow turnip" or "neep", while the smaller white variety are called "swede" or "white turnip". The yellow-fleshed type are known as "narkies" in Sunderland, and in past years used to be hollowed out and used as lanterns at Halloween,  as was the case in Scotland, before the acceptance of the American-style Halloween pumpkin.

Other vegetables
Kohlrabi is also called German turnip, turnip cabbage or cabbage turnip, although there the stem, not the root, is the enlarged part.

References

Brassicaceae
Plant common names